The 1999 Brown Bears football team was an American football team that represented Brown University during the 1999 NCAA Division I-AA football season. Brown was co-champion of the Ivy League. 

In their second season under head coach Phil Estes, the Bears compiled a 9–1 record and outscored opponents 324 to 239. James Perry, Jason Wargin and A. Smith
were the team captains. 

The Bears' 6–1 conference record tied for first place in the Ivy League standings. They outscored Ivy opponents 225 to 168. Brown's wins included a defeat of 1999's Ivy co-champion, Yale. It was Brown's first share of an Ivy title since 1976. 

Unranked throughout the year, Brown was finally recognized in the national Division I-AA poll after its final game of the season, ranked at No. 25.

Brown played its home games at Brown Stadium in Providence, Rhode Island.

Schedule

References

Brown
Brown Bears football seasons
Ivy League football champion seasons
Brown Bears football